Fear the Darkness is an original science fiction novel written by Mitchel Scanlon and based on the British comic strip Anderson:Psi Division (a spin-off from Judge Dredd) in 2000 AD. It is Scanlon's first Anderson novel.

Synopsis
Psychic Cassandra Anderson investigates a series of mysterious deaths of prisoners in a sector house, and discovers a malevolent presence. Outside the building is under attack by a mob of psychopaths.

References

External links
 Review at 2000adreview
 Entry at FictionDB

Judge Anderson novels
2006 novels
Fiction set in the 22nd century